Wolfgang Loos (born 6 August 1955) is a German retired footballer who played as a defender. He spent six seasons in the 2. Bundesliga with Preußen Münster and VfL Osnabrück.

Since retiring as a player, Loos has worked in various functions for a number of German football clubs, mostly as business manager or executive director, namely for VfL Osnabrück (1986–1992), Dynamo Dresden (1993), 1. FC Köln (1993–2002), Eintracht Braunschweig (2002–2006), 1. FC Saarbrücken (2007–2008), TuS Koblenz (2008–2011), and RB Leipzig (2011–2012). At Eintracht Braunschweig, he also took over as caretaker manager for a short time in 2004.

References

External links
 Official website
 

1955 births
Living people
Footballers from Essen
German footballers
Association football defenders
2. Bundesliga players
SC Preußen Münster players
VfL Osnabrück players
ASC Schöppingen players
German football managers
Eintracht Braunschweig non-playing staff
Eintracht Braunschweig managers
Dynamo Dresden non-playing staff